Borjabad may refer to:
 Borjabad, Kerman
 Borjabad, Razavi Khorasan